Logone may refer to:

 Logone River
 Republic of Logone
 Logone Oriental (disambiguation)
 Logone Occidental (disambiguation)